Pamlico Community College is a public community college in Grantsboro, North Carolina. It is part of the North Carolina Community College System.

History
The college began as an industrial education center in 1962.

Academics
The college has a transfer agreement with Barton College, enabling a student with a 2.0 GPA or higher with all standard admission requirements to be able to transfer to Barton College to complete a Bachelor's degree.

References

External links
Official website

Two-year colleges in the United States
North Carolina Community College System colleges
Educational institutions established in 1962
1962 establishments in North Carolina